The Hundred Steps may refer to:
One Hundred Steps, a 2000 Italian film known in its original language as I cento passi

The Hundred Steps (Barmouth, Wales)
The Hundred Steps (Renton, Scotland), a former drovers' road converted into a path